The Battle of Wisternitz or Dolní Věstonice was fought on 5 August 1619 between a Moravian force of the Bohemian Confederation under Friedrich von Tiefenbach (Teuffenbach) and a Habsburg army under Henri de Dampierre. The battle was a Moravian victory. The battle is part of the Thirty Years' War.

Budweis (České Budějovice) was one of the three towns which remained loyal to King Ferdinand of House Habsburg when Bohemia revolted. After the Habsburg victory at Sablat, the Bohemians were forced to raise the siege of České Budějovice. On 15 June 1619, Georg Friedrich of Hohenlohe-Neuenstein-Weikersheim  retreated to Soběslav where he awaited reinforcement by Count Heinrich Matthias von Thurn.

After taking control of the strong places of southern Bohemia, Ferdinand sent a force under Dampierre to Moravia, which had chosen the side of the Bohemian rebels. However, Dampierre was defeated at Dolní Věstonice by Moravian forces under von Tiefenbach (brother of Rudolf von Tiefenbach) and Ladislav Velen ze Žerotína in August 1619, which left Moravia in the Bohemian camp.

Notes

References
William P. Guthrie. Battles of the Thirty Years War: From White Mountain to Nordlingen, 1618–1635. Greenwood Publishing Group. Westport, Connecticut. 2002. 
Radek Fukala. Sen o odplatě. Dramata třicetileté války. Nakladatelství Epocha. 2005. 

1619 in Europe
Conflicts in 1619
Wisternitz 1619
Wisternitz 1619
Battles in Moravia
Battles involving Bohemia
Bohemian Revolt
History of the South Moravian Region